Otto van Rees (4 January 1823 – 10 March 1892) was a Dutch liberal politician and the Colonial Governor of the Dutch East Indies.

Van Rees was Minister of Colonial Affairs of the Netherlands in 1879. He was president of the House of Representatives of the Netherlands from 22 September 1881 to 19 January 1884 and Governor-General of the Dutch East Indies between 1884 and 1888.

Otto van Rees had the nickname ‘King Otto’ during the time he was the Colonial Governor in the Dutch East Indies.

References

External links 
 

1823 births
1892 deaths
Ministers of Colonial Affairs of the Netherlands
Speakers of the House of Representatives (Netherlands)
Governors-General of the Dutch East Indies
People from Culemborg
Commanders of the Order of the Netherlands Lion